Flip or Flop Vegas was a television series airing on HGTV hosted by real estate agent Aubrey Marunde and her husband/contractor Bristol. It was a spin-off of the HGTV series Flip or Flop. It premiered on April 6, 2017, and was filmed in Las Vegas, Nevada. On June 5, 2017, HGTV announced Flip or Flop Vegas would be renewed for a second season, with 16 episodes. The show was renewed for a third season and final season, which premiered March 21, 2019.

Premise
On March 1, 2017, HGTV announced the Flip or Flop Franchise would expand to Las Vegas, Nevada. The show features a new couple, Bristol and Aubrey Marunde, flipping houses in Las Vegas, Nevada. Bristol and Aubrey have the same roles as Tarek and Christina in the original Flip or Flop.

Hosts
Bristol and Aubrey Marunde are parents of two boys and have years of flipping experience. Aubrey is a real estate expert and designer, while Bristol is the contractor and handles design as well. Bristol is also a former MMA fighter.

Episodes

Season 1 (2017)

Season 2 (2018)

Season 3 (2019)

References

External links
 Official website
 TV Schedule

Flip or Flop (franchise)
2017 American television series debuts
2010s American reality television series
Television shows set in Las Vegas
Television shows shot in the Las Vegas Valley
Reality television spin-offs
American television spin-offs